Frederick, Duke of Schleswig-Holstein-Sonderburg-Augustenburg (10 December 1652 – 3 August 1692 in Edingen) was a Dano-German nobleman.  He was the oldest son of Duke Ernest Günther and his wife, Duchess Auguste.

Life 
He succeeded his father as Duke of Schleswig-Holstein-Sonderburg-Augustenburg in 1689.  However, he died only three years later, in 1692, during the war against the French.

Frederick was married to Anna Christine Bereuter; this marriage remained childless. He was succeeded by his younger brother Ernest August.

References 

1652 births
1692 deaths
Dukes of Schleswig-Holstein-Sonderburg-Augustenburg